The Naval Ordnance Department, also known as the Department of the Director of Naval Ordnance, was a former department of the Admiralty responsible for the procurement of naval ordnance of the Royal Navy. The department was managed by a Director, supported by various assistants and deputies; it existed from 1891 to 1958.

Precursors
Before 1855 the supply of guns and ammunition to the Royal Navy was the responsibility of the Ordnance Board, which was also concerned with supplying ordnance to the Army and which tended to concentrate on the latter function, although naval officers served on the board and on the Ordnance Select Committee which succeeded it. The Ordnance Board was abolished in May 1855, its responsibilities for naval ordnance passed to the War Office, where a naval officer was appointed Naval Director-General of Artillery within the Artillery Branch. He retained that title from 1858 to 1868, when he was also Director of Stores, War Office ; he was also the Vice-President of the Ordnance Select Committee.

History
A Director-General, subsequently Director of Naval Ordnance, in the Controller's Department of the Admiralty was first appointed in 1866, but he did not take over procurement of naval ordnance from the War Office until 1888 or custody and supply until 1891, when a Naval Ordnance Department was finally established at the Admiralty.

By stages from 1908 the Admiralty also took over responsibility from the War Office for inspecting naval ordnance when a Chief Inspector of Naval Ordnance was appointed. The Royal Ordnance Factories, under the control of the War Office, continued, however, to manufacture naval ordnance though a large proportion, including most of the heaviest guns, was let to private contract.

From 1917 until the department was responsible for mines and torpedoes. Between 1918 and 1923 and again from 1939 there was a separate Armament Supply Department.The Naval Ordnance Inspection Department was set up in 1922 to control quality in the manufacture and testing of weapons and ammunition for the fleet. Chemical and metallurgical analysis was carried out at its laboratories at Sheffield (the Bragg laboratory) and Caerwent.

During the First World War the directorate was divided, and a separate Department of the Director of Torpedoes and Mining was created. After the Second World War in 1946 this became the Underwater Weapons Department. The Bragg laboratory, so-called from 1938, continued unchanged until 1968, when its chemical analysis work became part of the Army Department's Directorate of Chemical Inspection at Woolwich. From 1941 to 1945 there was a Department of Miscellaneous Weapons Development.

In 1958 the two were re-united as divisions of the Weapons Department, under the Director General of Weapons (Director General, Weapons from 1960 to 1964). Bragg continued as the Naval Ordnance Inspection (later Service) and Metallurgical Unit (NOIMU, later NOSMU) until 1984 when it was closed and its work transferred to Woolwich. Caerwent laboratory continued investigating propellants until 1971.

Directors
Included:

Directors of Naval Ordnance
 Rear-Admiral Astley Cooper Key, September 1866-July 1869 
 Captain Arthur W. A. Hood, July 1869-May 1874 
 Rear-Admiral Henry Boys, May 1874-May 1878 
 Rear-Admiral Richard Vesey Hamilton, June 1878-March 1880 
 Rear-Admiral Frederick A. Herbert, April 1880-April 1883 
 Rear-Admiral John Ommanney Hopkins, April 1883-November 1886

Directors of Naval Ordnance and Torpedoes
Included:
 Rear-Admiral John A. Fisher, November 1886-May 1891 
 Rear-Admiral Compton E. Domvile, May 1891-March 1894 
 Captain Henry Coey Kane, March 1894-August 1897 
 Rear-Admiral Edmund Jeffreys, August 1897-January 1901 
 Captain William H. May, January–April 1901 
 Rear-Admiral Angus MacLeod, April 1901-January 1904 
 Rear-Admiral Henry Deacon Barry, January 1904-February 1905 
 Rear-Admiral John R. Jellicoe. February 1905-August 1907 
 Captain Reginald H.S. Bacon, August 1907-December 1909 
 Captain Archibald G.H.W. Moore, December 1909-June 1912 
 Captain Frederick C.T.Tudor, June 1912-August 1914 
 Captain Morgan Singer, August 1914-March 1917

Directors of Naval Ordnance
Included:
 Captain Frederic Charles Dreyer, March 1917-June 1918  
 Captain Henry R. Crooke, June 1918-September 1920  
 Captain Roger R.C.Backhouse, September 1920-December 1922  
 Captain Joseph C.W.Henley, December 1922-May 1925,   
 Captain Charles M. Forbes, July 1925-July 1928  
 Captain Julian F.C.Patterson, July 1928-April 1931,   
 Captain F. Thomas B. Tower, April 1931-July 1933  
 Captain Bruce A. Fraser, July 1933-March 1936  
 Captain Charles E. B. Simeon, March 1936-May 1939,   
 Captain John C. Leach, May 1939-January 1941  
 Captain William R. Slayter, January–August 1941  
 Captain Oliver Bevir, August 1941-March 1944  
 Captain Charles H. L. Woodhouse, March 1944-February 1945  
 Rear-Admiral Charles H. L. Woodhouse, March 1945-February 1946  
 Captain Dennis M. Lees, February 1946-December 1948  
 Captain Henry A. King, December 1948-June 1951  
 Captain William J. Yendell, June 1951-March 1954  
 Captain John Graham Hamilton, March 1954-March 1956  
 Captain Richard E. Washbourn, March 1956-May 1958  
 Rear-Admiral Gilbert C. de Jersey, May–July 1958

Assistant Directors
Included:Assistant Directors of Torpedoes
 Captain Arthur K. Wilson, 1887–1888 
 Captain Edmund F. Jeffreys, 1889–1893 
 Captain William H. 1893–1895 
 Captain The Hon. Maurice A. Bourke, 1895-1896
 Captain Sir Baldwin W. Walker, 1895-1897
 Captain Ernest A. Simons, 1898 
 Captain George Le C. Egerton, 1898– 1899 
 Captain Alexander W. Chisholm-Batten, 1899–1901
 Captain George Le C. Egerton,  1901–1902 
 Captain Henry B. Jackson, 1902–1903 
 Captain The Hon. Alexander E. Bethell, 1903–1906 
 Captain Bernard Currey, 21 December 1906–1908 
 Captain Stuart Nicholson, 21 December 1908–1911 
 Captain Edward F. B. Charlton,  1911–1914 
 Captain Philip W. Dumas, 15 August 1914–1917 
 Captain Algernon H. C. Candy, 8 February 1917–1919 
 Captain Brien M. Money,  1919–1921 
 Captain Arthur T. Walker,  1921–1922

Assistant Directors of Naval Ordnance
 Captain Frederick C. T. Tudor,  1906–1909
 Captain Arthur W. Craig,  1909–1911 
 Captain James C. Ley,  1911–1912 
 Captain James D. Dick,  1912–1914
 Commander Basil E. Reinold,  1914-1915  
 Captain Herbert R. Norbury, 1915-1916 
 Captain Joseph C. W. Henley,  1917–1919

Deputy Directors
Included:

Deputy Directors of Naval Ordnance
 Captain Cecil V. Usborne, January 1919-May 1921   
 Captain Roger R.C. Backhouse, August–September 1920   
 Captain G.T. Carlisle P. Swabey, May 1921-October 1923   
 Captain George R.B. Blount, October 1923-August 1925   
 Captain Charles A. Scott, August 1925-April 1928   
 Captain A. Ramsay Dewar, April 1928-September 1929   
 Captain Frank Elliott, September 1929-March 1932   
 Captain A. Francis Pridham, March 1932-April 1933   
 Captain Eric R. Bent, April 1933-October 1934   
 Captain Gerard W.T. Robertson, October 1934-March 1936   
 Captain Harold R.G. Kinahan, March 1936-June 1937   
 Captain Francis W.H. Jeans, June 1937-July 1938   
 Captain Michael M. Denny, July 1938-March 1940   
 Captain William R. Slayter, March 1940-January 1941   
 Captain Frederick R. Parham, January 1941-August 1942   
 Captain Patrick V. McLaughlin, August 1942-March 1943   
 Captain Robert F. Elkins, March 1943-November 1944   
 Captain Kenneth L. Harkness, April 1943-February 1945   
 Captain Henry N.S. Brown, February 1945-October 1947   
 Captain Alan F. Campbell, September 1946-September 1948   
 Captain Thomas V. Briggs, October 1947 – 1949   
 Captain William J. Lamb, September 1948 – 1950   
 Captain Desmond P. Dreyer, July 1949-September 1952   
 Captain Richard E. Washbourn, September 1950 – 1953   
 Captain Francis W.R. Larken, September 1952-November 1955   
 Captain Thomas W. Best, November 1955 – 1958

Subsidiary departments
Note: At various times were under the control of the Director of Naval Ordnance.
 Naval Ordnance Stores Department,  (1891-1918)
 Armament Supply Department, (1918-1964)
 Royal Naval Armaments Depot
 Department of the Chief Inspector of Naval Ordnance, (1908-1922)
 Naval Ordnance Inspection Department, (1922-1964)

See also
Board of Ordnance

Notes

References 
 Harley, Simon and Lovell Tony. (2017), "Naval Ordnance Department (Royal Navy)", The Dreadnought Project. http://www.dreadnoughtproject.org/Naval Ordnance Department (primary sources for this article)
 Mackie, Colin. "British Armed Forces from 1860, Senior Royal Navy Appointments from 1865". gulabin. Colin Mackie, pp. 51–51, January 2017.
 The National. "Records of Naval Ordnance Departments and Establishments". discovery.nationalarchives.gov.uk. National Archives, 1736-1974, ADM Division 9. Retrieved 28 March 2017. This article contains text from this source, which is available under the  Open Government Licence v3.0. © Crown copyright.

External links

Admiralty departments
1891 establishments in the United Kingdom
1958 disestablishments in the United Kingdom